Peyton–Ellington Building is a historic commercial building located at Charlottesville, Virginia. It was built in 1893, and is a two-story, three-bay, brick building with an iron front facade.  The facade features decorated pilasters at each end that support a cornice with a plain frieze, modillions, and cornice stops.

It was listed on the National Register of Historic Places in 1982.

References

Commercial buildings on the National Register of Historic Places in Virginia
Victorian architecture in Virginia
Commercial buildings completed in 1893
Buildings and structures in Charlottesville, Virginia
National Register of Historic Places in Charlottesville, Virginia